The following lists events that happened during 1799 in Australia.

Leaders
Monarch - George III
Governor of New South Wales – John Hunter
Lieutenant-Governor of Norfolk Island – Philip Gidley King
 Inspector of Public Works – Richard Atkins

Events
 7 January – Bass and Flinders complete their circumnavigation of Van Diemen's Land in sloop Norfolk.
 11 February – The gaol in Sydney is burned by arsonists.
 3 March – Hawkesbury River floods, killing one.
 12 March – Isaac Nichols is accused of stealing stolen goods and sentenced to 14 years on Norfolk Island; his sentence is suspended by Governor Hunter on 1 April
 8 July – Matthew Flinders leaves Port Jackson to explore the East coast in sloop Norfolk; he surveys Moreton Bay between the 15th and 31st and charts Hervey Bay on 2 August. He returns to Sydney on 20 August.
 18 October – Five settlers are found guilty of killing aborigines in the Hawkesbury, they are later pardoned.
 5 November – Hunter is recalled and Philip Gidley King is named as his successor
 28 December – The gaol in Parramatta is lost to arson.

Births
25 August – John Dunmore Lang
2 October – William Lonsdale
15 October – Archibald Mosman

Deaths
26 January – Thomas Muir

References

 
Years of the 18th century in Australia